Crazy New Year's Eve is a 2015 Chinese romantic comedy family film directed by Eva Jin, Pan Anzi, Zhang Jiarui and Song Di. It was released on February 6, 2015.

Cast
Amber Kuo
Jam Hsiao
Zanilia Zhao
Rhydian Vaughan
Xia Yu
Crazybarby Leni Lan
Mei Ting
Zhang Yi
Gordon Lam
Da Peng
Jiang Jinfu
Sun Yizhou
Chang Xinyuan
Kan Qingzi
Julius Liu
Show Joy 
Qiao Shan
Eva Jin
White. K
Gabriella

Reception
The film  earned  at the Chinese box office.

References

2015 romantic comedy films
Chinese romantic comedy films
Films directed by Pan Anzi
Films directed by Eva Jin